Michael I Cerularius or Keroularios (1000 – 21 January 1059 AD) was the Patriarch of Constantinople from 1043 to 1059 AD. His disputes with Pope Leo IX over church practices in the 11th century played a role in the events that led to the Great Schism in 1054.

Background 
Michael Cerularius was born in Constantinople around 1000 AD and joined the Church at a young age.

Schism 
Michael quarreled with Pope Leo IX over church practices in which the Roman Church differed from Constantinople, particularly the use of unleavened bread in the Eucharist. Dissenting opinions were also exchanged over other theological and cultural issues, ranging from the issue of papal supremacy in the Church to the filioque clause and other disagreements between the patriarchates.

In 1054, Pope Leo IX sent a letter to Michael, citing a large portion of the Donation of Constantine believing it genuine.

"The first pope who used it [the Donation] in an official act and relied upon it, was Leo IX; in a letter of 1054 to Michael Cærularius, Patriarch of Constantinople, he cites the "Donatio" to show that the Holy See possessed both an earthly and a heavenly imperium, the royal priesthood."

Some scholars say that this letter of September 1053, the text of which is available in Migne, Patrologia Latina, vol. 143, coll. 744-769, was never actually despatched, but was set aside, and that the papal reply actually sent was the softer but still harsh letter Scripta tuae of January 1054.

Leo IX assured Michael that the donation was completely genuine, not a fable or old wives' tale, arguing that only the apostolic successor to Peter possessed primacy in the Church.

This letter of Pope Leo IX, addressed both to Patriarch Michael I and Archbishop Leo of Ohrid, was in response to a letter sent by Archbishop Leo to Bishop John of Trani that categorically attacked the customs of the Latin Church that differed from those of the Greeks. Especially criticized were the Roman traditions of fasting on the Saturday Sabbath and consecration of unleavened bread. Leo IX in his letter accused Constantinople of historically being a center of heresies and claimed in emphatic terms the primacy of the bishop of Rome over the patriarch of Constantinople. Cerularius would have none of it. It can be argued that in 1054, Michael's letter to Leo IX initiated the events which followed, because it claimed the title "ecumenical patriarch" and addressed Pope Leo as "brother" rather than "father."

Pope Leo IX sent an official delegation on a legatine mission to meet with Michael. Members of the papal delegation were Cardinal Humbert of Silva Candida, papal secretary Frederick of Lorraine, and Archbishop Peter of Amalfi. Soon after their arrival in Constantinople, news was received that Pope Leo had died on 19 April. Since the official position and authority of papal legates was dependent upon the pope who authorized them to represent him, the news of Leo's death placed his envoys in an awkward position. In spite of this, they decided to proceed with their mission, but even before any religious discussions were held, problems arose regarding some basic formalities and ceremonies. During the initial audience, Cerularius refused to meet with papal envoys in their official capacity and left them waiting with no further audience for months.

During that time, from April to July 1054, Cardinal Humbert and his colleagues continued with their activities in Constantinople, taking part in informal religious discussions on various issues. This was seen as inappropriate by Patriarch Michael. Despite the fact that their legatine authority officially ceased after the pope’s death, Cardinal Humbert and his colleagues decided to engage in open dispute with the patriarch. On Saturday, 16 July 1054, they produced a charter of excommunication (lat. charta excommunicationis), directed against Patriarch Michael, Archbishop Leo, and all of their followers. On the same day, Cardinal Humbert and his colleagues entered the church of the Hagia Sophia during the divine liturgy and placed the charter on the altar.

Soon after that, the patriarch decided to react. On 20 July 1054, a synod of 21 metropolitans and bishops was held in Constantinople, presided over by Cerularius. The council decided to excommunicate Cardinal Humbert and his colleagues. Only the three men were anathematized, and a general reference was made to all who support them - there was no explicit excommunication of the entire Western Christianity, or of the Church of Rome. On Sunday 24 July the conciliar anathema was officially proclaimed in the Hagia Sophia Church.

The events of 1054 caused the East-West Schism and led to the end of the alliance between the Byzantine emperors and the popes. Later popes allied with the Normans against the Byzantine Empire. Patriarch Michael closed the Latin churches in his area, which exacerbated the schism. In 1965, those excommunications were rescinded by Pope Paul VI and Patriarch Athenagoras following their 1964 meeting in Jerusalem.
Although the excommunication delivered by Cardinal Humbert was invalid, the 1965 gesture represented a significant step towards restoring  communion between Rome and Constantinople.

Byzantine politics 
The short reign of the Empress Theodora then saw Michael intriguing against the throne. Michael Psellus notes that while their initial relations had been cordial, once Theodora took the throne, they entered into open conflict, as Michael "was vexed because the Roman Empire was being governed by a woman", and on this topic "he spoke his mind freely". The historian suggests that Theodora would have deposed Michael for his open effrontery and sedition, had she lived longer.

Cerularius had a hand in negotiating the abdication of Theodora's successor, Michael VI Stratiotikos, convincing him to step down on 31 August 1057, in favour of the rebellious general Isaac I Komnenos, for whom the army declared on 8 June.  The emperor duly followed the patriarch's advice and became a monk.  Having had a role in bringing him to the throne, Cerularius soon quarrelled with Isaac over confiscation of church property. Michael went so far as to take the highly symbolic step of donning the purple shoes ceremonially reserved for the emperor. Michael apparently planned a rebellion, intending to overthrow Isaac and claim the throne for himself or for his relative Constantine Doukas.  Isaac exiled Michael to Proconnesus in 1058 and, as Michael refused to step down, had Psellus drew up accusations of heresy and treason against him. Cerularius died before coming to trial.

References

Sources 
 
Migne's Patrologia Latina, Vol. 143 (cxliii), Leo IX Epistolae Et Decreta .pdf – 1.9 Mb. See Col. 744B-769D (pgs. 76–89) for Leo IX's letter.
 
Michael Psellus, Fourteen Byzantine Rulers (The Chronographia), E.R.A. Sewter, trans. New York: Penguin, 1966.
 
Skylitzes, John (John Wortley, trans. and J-C. Cheynet, notes). Cambridge: University Press, 2010.

1000s births
1059 deaths
11th-century patriarchs of Constantinople
East–West Schism
Founders of religions
People excommunicated by the Catholic Church
Keroularios family
Filioque